1800 Tequila is a Mexican brand of tequila owned by the Beckmann Family, who also own the Jose Cuervo tequila brand. The 100% blue agave tequila is bottled in Jalisco, Mexico. 1800 is named after the year tequila was first aged in oak casks, and is sold throughout the world. In the United States, the brand is imported and distributed by the Beckmann family's US distribution company, Proximo Spirits.

History
The first officially licensed tequila manufacturer was Jose Antonio Cuervo of Jalisco, Mexico, in 1758, after he was given the rights by King Ferdinand VI of Spain to cultivate a portion of land. Shortly thereafter, the production of tequila was banned, until 1795, when King Carlos IV lifted the ban. 1800 is widely known as the year in which tequila was first successfully aged in wood.

Originally known as Cuervo 1800 Tequila, 1800 Tequila was launched in 1975 as a premium sipping tequila. The Silver, Añejo and Reposado labels were introduced in 2004. Since 2008, it has been distributed in the US by Proximo Spirits. That year, the Select Silver label was introduced, as the first and only 100 proof clear tequila. In 2006, 1800 introduced The Ultimate Margarita, 19.9 proof and the only pre-mixed, ready-to-serve margarita mix made with 100% blue agave tequila (1800 Silver).

Varieties

Honors and awards
At the 2008 San Francisco Wine and Spirits Competition, the Silver, Reposado and Añejo tequilas each won the silver medal, while the Milenio and Select Silver both received the bronze medal. In 2009, Bloomberg Businessweek named 1800 Select Silver one of the world's 20 best-tasting tequilas. Wine Enthusiast placed the 1800 Coleccion, an extra añejo, in its "96–100" scoring category. It was described by The New York Times as "sweetly vegetal and very rich with an elegant aftertaste."

Packaging

Bottle
1800s bottles have a trapezoidal shape and used to have a top designed to serve as a shot glass, by loosening the top slightly, turning the bottle upside down, and filling up the top.

Essential Artist Series
In 2008, 1800 Tequila released a special limited-edition Essential Artist Series, with 12 unique bottle designs. A second series was released in 2009 with one "celebrity artist" bottle created by Shepard Fairey's firm Studio Number One, plus 11 new designs picked from 15,000 online submissions from across the United States, including a $10,000 grand prize winner. Other series bottle designers include artists Gary Baseman, Yuko Shimizu and Tara McPherson. As of 2013, 1800 is on its fifth annual Essential Artists series. Each year, 1,800 of each Essential Artists bottle are produced.

Marketing

Celebrity endorsements
In October 2013, 1800 launched a new international advertising campaign featuring actor Ray Liotta in four commercials, directed by Anthony Mandler. Each of the moody spots are free of dialogue (with the exception of several where Liotta orders the tequila, with the only piece of dialogue being "1800"), were filmed in Buenos Aires and show Liotta traveling to get to a glass of 1800 Tequila. A previous 1800 campaign from 2011 featured actor Michael Imperioli in eight different commercials with a straightforward approach coveting the values of an older generation; and in 2009, rapper Rick Ross and his crew, the Triple C's, became brand ambassadors by publicly endorsing Select Silver.

Sponsorships
1800 Silver has two sponsorships with two NBA teams, signing marketing agreements with the Los Angeles Lakers in 2009 (becoming the first spirits brand to sponsor the Lakers), and with the New York Knicks the following year. The agreements with both teams include ad placement at their respective stadiums, the Staples Center and Madison Square Garden, on the teams' websites, and various promotional activities throughout the NBA season.

References

External links
 
 1800 Tequila on Facebook

Tequila
Alcoholic drink brands
Drink companies of Mexico
Mexican brands